Anton Kuzmin (born 20 November 1996) is a Kazakh cyclist, who currently rides for UCI Continental team .

Major results
2014
 3rd Time trial, National Junior Road Championships
2017
 8th Overall Gemenc Grand Prix
2018
 6th Overall Tour of Cartier
 9th Overall Bałtyk–Karkonosze Tour
1st Young rider classification
2019
 3rd Road race, National Road Championships
 7th Overall Bałtyk–Karkonosze Tour
 9th Overall Szlakiem Grodów Piastowskich
 10th Overall Tour of Almaty
2022
 1st Grand Prix Cappadocia
 3rd Time trial, National Road Championships
 8th Grand Prix Kapuzbaşı
 10th Grand Prix Mediterranean
2023
 5th Overall Tour of Sharjah

References

External links

1996 births
Living people
Kazakhstani male cyclists
People from Taldykorgan
20th-century Kazakhstani people
21st-century Kazakhstani people